Johan Emiel Scheffer (born 7 February 1948, in Jakarta) is a former member of the Victorian Legislative Council for the Labor Party.

He was originally elected to the Legislative Council in 2002 for Monash Province, becoming only the second Labor member to represent that electorate since its creation in 1937. When Monash Province was abolished in 2006, he was successful in winning one of the five seats in the newly created Eastern Victoria Region of the Legislative Council.

Johan Scheffer joined the Australian Labor Party (ALP) in 1991 and shortly after joined its Socialist Left faction. He was active in the Victorian Branch, holding positions of Local FEA (Federal Electorate Assembly) Secretary and State Conference Delegate for the Federal electorate of Melbourne Ports (renamed Macnamara in 2019). He was elected to the party's State Administrative Committee and to the Agenda Committee (1996-2009), playing a key role in reorganising the policy development process through the active participation of the party's rank and file, factional groups, affiliated unions, the Parliamentary wing and adoption by State Conference. Johan Scheffer joined with other like-minded party members in efforts to stamp out branch stacking that had become rife, especially in electorates winnable for Labor. He was an active campaigner in exposing breaches of Party rules and bringing complaints to the Party's Disputes Tribunal.

In 1993 Johan Scheffer joined the staff of the Federal Member for Melbourne Ports, Hon Clyde Holding MHR, until Holding's retirement in 1998, when Scheffer joined the staff of Victorian MP, Hon Barry Pullen MLC in the then seat of Melbourne Province. Pullen did not contest the 1999 Victorian election, making way for Gavin Jennings, who was elected to represent the seat in 1999 as part of the new Labor Government led by Steve Bracks. Johan Scheffer was appointed an adviser to Jennings, in his role as Cabinet Secretary (1999-2002).

In 2002, Johan Scheffer nominated for the seat of Monash Province in the Victorian Legislative Council. After a bitter pre-selection battle, he won the nomination and was elected to the Council in the Victorian State election of 30 November 2002. During his 12 years in the Parliament, Johan Scheffer focussed on promoting community understanding of Labor's program. He pushed for reforms that would address global warming and protect the environment; strengthen industrial rights and worker conditions; advance the development of environmentally sustainable urban planning; reduce gender inequality; eliminate family violence; enhance LGBT rights and understanding; protect women's reproductive rights; build cohesive local communities including harmonious ethnic and religious groups. Scheffer lead the campaign to lay underground power lines from the Latrobe Valley to the Victorian Desalination Plant to protect farming in South Gippsland. He advocated for major and long-term investment in the Latrobe Valley to protect livelihoods after the inevitable decommissioning of the Valley's coal mines. Johan Scheffer chaired a number of Joint Investigatory Committees of the Parliament, including the Drugs and Crime Prevention Committee, the Family and Community Services Committee and the Law Reform Committee. He also served on the Economic Development, Infrastructure and Outer Suburban/Interface Services and Education Committees.

Early Life

Johan Scheffer was born in Batavia (Jakarta) in the Dutch East Indies (Indonesia) on 7 February 1948 to Cornelis Scheffer and Aleida Charlotte Maria Eugenie Scheffer-Verwey. His family on both sides had lived in Java since the middle of the nineteenth century. On his mother's side, his antecedents are of mixed Javanese and European background, whereas on his father's side they are of Dutch origin. Johan Scheffer's early immersion in Indonesian and Dutch cultures, as well as his dual nationality has given him an international outlook and a suspicion of nationalism.

Johan Scheffer's early years were spent in Java and the Netherlands. After settling in The Hague in 1949, the family departed from the Netherlands in 1952 for Australia, intending to move from there to Malaya. Aleida and Cornelis were people of strong political opinions, engaged in the cross currents of their historical moment, especially the Japanese occupation of the Dutch East Indies and their support of independence from Dutch colonialism. The adversities his parents experienced as immigrants in Australia influenced Scheffer's understanding of immigration, ethnicity and class struggle. He attended Gardenvale Infant School, St Kilda Primary School and Elwood High School, matriculating in 1966. He enrolled for a Bachelor of Arts degree at Monash University, majoring in literature. During his time at university he was active in student politics and participated in a number of campaigns, including the resistance and mobilisation against Australian and US involvement in the Vietnam War. His university studies of literature, philosophy, classical civilisation, history and politics introduced Scheffer to cultural studies, the history of ideas and the struggle for political emancipation, and to Marxism and the socialist tradition, which shaped his understanding of history and class struggle.

Career

Johan Scheffer completed his teacher training at the University of Melbourne in 1972 and taught history and geography at Bourke Hall, the Junior School of Xavier College, in 1973. In 1974 and 1975 he taught English literature at the De La Salle College, Malvern. He taught politics, literature, history and English at University High School from 1976 until 1984 and was an activist member of the Victorian Secondary Teachers Association (VSTA). By the late 1970s Scheffer had joined the Australian Communist Party (CPA). Johan Scheffer was a program consultant in the Australian Schools Commission's Disadvantaged Schools Program (1984-1988) and for a time, a member of the Program's Ministerial Advisory Committee. He worked in the inner city suburbs of Flemington, North Melbourne, Carlton and Fitzroy and was active in local government issues in the City of Melbourne. In 1988 he was appointed State Manager of the Out of Schools Hours Child Care Program that was located in the Women's Employment Branch within the Victorian Department of Labour. This program was a Victorian Government strategy to support the Keating Government’s efforts to facilitate women's career and employment opportunities. In 1992 Scheffer was appointed researcher within the Victorian Department of the Premier and Cabinet's Social Justice Consultative Council.

With the fall of the Victorian Labor Government in 1992 and the election of the reactionary, neo-liberal Government of Jeff Kennett, the period of Labor reform led by Premiers John Cain and Joan Kirner was at an end. With little prospect of actively contributing to progressive reform through working in the bureaucracy, Scheffer resigned from the Victorian Public Service in 1992 to join the staff of the Hon Clyde Holding MHR in 1993 until Holding's retirement in 1998, after which he joined the staff of the Hon Barry Pullen, Member for the Victorian Legislative Council seat of Melbourne until Pullen's retirement, when the seat was won by Gavin Jennings.

From 1999 until 2002, Johan Scheffer was an advisor to the Hon Gavin Jennings MP, Cabinet Secretary in the first Labor Government of Premier Steve Bracks, after which he was himself elected to the Legislative Council of the Parliament of Victoria, retiring at the election of 2014.

Personal Life

Johan Scheffer lives in Melbourne, Australia, with his partner, Angela Palmer. They have two sons and one granddaughter.

References

1948 births
Living people
Australian Labor Party members of the Parliament of Victoria
Members of the Victorian Legislative Council
21st-century Australian politicians
Indonesian emigrants to Australia
Indonesian people of Dutch descent
Australian people of Dutch descent
Monash University alumni
Xavier College
University of Melbourne alumni
Australian schoolteachers
Politicians from Melbourne
Public servants from Melbourne